Carol Bishop-Gwyn is a Canadian writer and dance academic, best known as the author of The Pursuit of Perfection: A Life of Celia Franca, a biography of Celia Franca published in 2011. The book was a shortlisted nominee for the Governor General's Award for English-language non-fiction at the 2012 Governor General's Awards, and for the 2013 Charles Taylor Prize.

She has taught courses in dance history at Ryerson University, York University and The School of Toronto Dance Theatre, and has worked as a freelance magazine writer and as a contributor to CBC Radio.

She was married to Canadian journalist and historian Richard Gwyn from 2005 until his death in 2020.

References

Canadian biographers
21st-century Canadian historians
Canadian arts journalists
Canadian women non-fiction writers
Canadian magazine writers
Writers from Toronto
Living people
Dance historians
Women biographers
21st-century Canadian women writers
21st-century biographers
Year of birth missing (living people)